Gaston Rebry (29 January 1905 – 3 July 1953) was a Belgian former champion road racing cyclist between 1928 and 1935.

In 1934, Rebry became the third of nine riders to win the Tour of Flanders and Paris–Roubaix in the same year; he also won Paris–Nice that year. Rebry won Paris–Roubaix three times. He also won four stages of the Tour de France.

His son, Gaston Rebry (1933–2007), was also a road-racing cyclist in the 1950s but moved to Canada in 1954 to become a landscape painter. He died on January 5, 2007

Major results

1926
 3rd, Paris–Roubaix
1928
 12th, Overall, Tour de France
 1st, Stage 3, (Cherbourg - Dinan)
1929
 10th, Overall, Tour de France
 yellow jersey as leader of the general classification after stage 8
 1st, Stage 14, (Nice - Grenoble)
1931
 1st, Paris–Roubaix
 4th, Overall, Tour de France
 1st, Stage 23, (Charleville - Malo les Bains, 271 km)
1932
 20th, Overall, Tour de France
 1st, Stage 19, (Charleville - Malo les Bains, 271 km)
1933
 14th, Overall, Tour de France
1934
 1st, Paris–Roubaix
 1st, Tour of Flanders
 1st, Paris–Nice
1935
 1st, Paris–Roubaix

External links 

Official Tour de France results

1905 births
1953 deaths
Belgian male cyclists
Belgian Tour de France stage winners
Sportspeople from West Flanders
People from Ledegem